"Eternity Road" is a song by the band the Moody Blues, written by band member Ray Thomas, from their 1969 album To Our Children's Children's Children.

Background
Interviewed by Jason Barnard, for website thestrangebrew.co.uk in 2014, Thomas said:

Personnel
Source:
 Ray Thomas – vocals, flute
 Justin Hayward – acoustic guitar, electric guitar, backing vocals
 John Lodge – bass guitar, backing vocals
 Mike Pinder – Mellotron, piano, backing vocals
 Graeme Edge – drums, percussion

References

1969 songs
The Moody Blues songs
Songs written by Ray Thomas
Songs about outer space